AgFirst, part of the US Farm Credit System, serves as a wholesale lender and business-service provider to a network of local farm credit associations in 15 southern and eastern states, Washington, D.C., and Puerto Rico. It was formed in 1995 by the merger of the Farm Credit Bank of Baltimore and the Farm Credit Bank of Columbia. The lender is cooperatively owned by 22 local associations. These associations, operating as Farm Credit and Ag Credit associations, provide real estate and production financing to about 80,000 farmers, agribusinesses, and rural homeowners.  

AgFirst is headquartered in Columbia, South Carolina in the former Bank of America Plaza.

References

External links 
 
 Hoovers Report on Agfirst
 Farm Credit Administration in the Federal Register

Farm Credit System
Companies based in South Carolina